José Juan García Manríquez (born 26 February 1996) is a Mexican professional footballer who plays as a centre-back for Liga MX club Atlético San Luis, on loan from Juárez.

Career statistics

Club

References

External links
 
 
 

Living people
1996 births
Mexican footballers
Sportspeople from Michoacán
Association football defenders
Atlante F.C. footballers
Atlético Reynosa footballers
Correcaminos UAT footballers
FC Juárez footballers
Ascenso MX players
Liga de Expansión MX players
Liga MX players
Liga Premier de México players